Rio Grande is a 1950 American romantic Western film directed by John Ford and starring John Wayne and Maureen O'Hara. It is the third installment of Ford's "Cavalry Trilogy", following two RKO Pictures releases: Fort Apache (1948) and She Wore a Yellow Ribbon (1949). Wayne plays the lead in all three films, as Captain Kirby York in Fort Apache, then as Captain Nathan Brittles in She Wore a Yellow Ribbon, and finally as a promoted Lieutenant Colonel Kirby Yorke in Rio Grande (scripts and production billing spell the York[e] character's surname differently in Fort Apache and Rio Grande). Rio Grande'''s supporting cast features Ben Johnson, Claude Jarman Jr., Harry Carey Jr., Chill Wills, J. Carrol Naish, Victor McLaglen, Grant Withers, the Western singing group the Sons of the Pioneers and Stan Jones.

Plot
In the summer of 1879, "fifteen years after the Shenandoah", Lieutenant Colonel Kirby Yorke (Wayne) is posted on the Texas frontier with the 2nd U.S. Cavalry Regiment to defend settlers against attacks by marauding Apaches. Yorke has just captured the Apache's leader. He is under considerable pressure due to the Apaches using Mexico as a sanctuary from pursuit, and by a serious shortage of troops in his command.

Yorke's son (whom he has not seen in 15 years), Trooper Jefferson Yorke (Claude Jarman Jr.), is one of 18 recruits sent to the regiment. He had flunked out of West Point, but immediately enlisted as a private in the Army. In a private "father-son" meeting in the commanding officer's tent, Trooper Yorke informs his father that he does not expect, nor want, any special treatment because he is his son. He asks that he be treated like any other soldier—to which the colonel agrees. By his willingness to undergo any test and trial, Jefferson is befriended by a pair of older recruits, Travis Tyree (Ben Johnson) (who is on the run from the law) and Daniel "Sandy" Boone (Harry Carey Jr.), who take him under their wings.

Two U.S. marshals from Texas arrive at the post with a warrant for Trooper Tyree's arrest on a manslaughter charge, but he hides behind the horses and the marshals leave without discovering him. 

Yorke's estranged wife, Kathleen (Maureen O'Hara), arrives unexpectedly to take the underage Jefferson home by buying him out of his enlistment. During the Civil War, Yorke had been forced by circumstances to burn Bridesdale, his wife's plantation home in the Shenandoah Valley. Sergeant Major Quincannon (Victor McLaglen), who put the torch to Bridesdale, is still with Yorke and is a constant reminder to Kathleen of the episode. In a showdown with his mother, Jeff refuses her attempt to buy him out of the Army by reminding her that not only the commander's signature is required to discharge him, but his own is needed, as well, and he chooses to stay in the Army. The struggle over their son's future (and possibly the attentions shown to her by Yorke's junior officers) rekindles the romance the couple once felt for each other.

The Apaches attack the fort one night. Many of them are killed by the awakened troopers, but they succeed in freeing their leader.
 
One of the U.S. marshals returns and arrests Tyree, who is then confined to the post hospital while they await Yorke's return from patrol to sign the warrant. When Yorke's patrol reaches the Rio Grande, too late to capture the Apaches he was following, he meets a Mexican patrol. They exchange cordialities and both confirm that the US troops cannot cross into Mexico. After his return to the fort, Tyree, with the connivance of the regimental surgeon (Chill Wills) and Quincannon, breaks jail, steals Yorke's horse, and goes on the run, intending to stay away until the marshal leaves.

Yorke is visited by his former Civil War commander, Philip Sheridan (J. Carrol Naish), now Commanding General of the Military Division of the Missouri, the headquarters responsible for pacifying the Great Plains. Sheridan has decided to order Yorke to cross the Rio Grande into Mexico in pursuit of the Apaches and kill them all, an action with serious political implications, since it violates the sovereignty of another nation.

If Yorke fails in his mission to destroy the Apache threat, he will have to face a court-martial. Sheridan, in quiet acknowledgment of what he is asking Yorke to risk, promises that if it comes to that, "the members of the court will be the men who rode down the Shenandoah with us" during the Civil War. Yorke accepts the assignment.

Before Yorke leads his men toward Mexico, he sends the women and children to Ft. Bliss for safety, with an escort including Jefferson. Jefferson and Boone meet Tyree who informs them that there are Apaches in the area. The Apaches attack the wagons and capture the one carrying the children and corporal Bell's wife. While the remaining escort fends of the Apache, Jefferson is sent back to the fort to tell them what has happened. He is nearly caught by three Apaches but is saved by Tyree who was following the escort.

The regiment meets the remainder of the escort, which lost four troopers killed, and then follows the Apache. They discover the burnt out wagon and corporal Bell's wife who has been killed, but there is no sign of the children. In the meantime, Tyree rejoins to the regiment and tells them he trailed the Apaches to their hideout in Mexico. Yorke and Tyree then form a plan to rescue the children. After permitting three troopers, Tyree, Boone, and Jefferson, to infiltrate the ruined church in the Mexican village where the Apaches have taken the children, Yorke leads his regiment in an all-out attack. The cavalrymen rescue all of the children unharmed, though Colonel Yorke is wounded by an arrow that he orders Jeff to remove. He is taken back to the fort by his victorious troops, where Kathleen meets him and holds his hand as he is carried on a travois into the post.

After Colonel Yorke recovers, Tyree, Boone, Jeff, Navajo Scout Son of Many Mules, and Corporal Bell are decorated. At the ceremony, when one of the Texas marshals reappears, Trooper Tyree is given a furlough to continue his run from the law, stealing General Sheridan's horse for the purpose. As the troops pass in review the regimental band plays Dixie at the General's request, apparently to please Mrs. Yorke.

 Cast 

 John Wayne as Lieutenant Colonel Kirby Yorke
 Maureen O'Hara as Kathleen Yorke

 Ben Johnson as Trooper Travis Tyree
 Claude Jarman Jr. as Trooper Jefferson Yorke
 Harry Carey Jr. as Trooper Daniel "Sandy" Boone
 Chill Wills as Dr. Wilkins, Regimental Surgeon

 J. Carrol Naish as General Philip Sheridan
 Victor McLaglen as Sergeant Major Quincannon
 Grant Withers as Deputy Marshal
 Sons of the Pioneers as the Regimental Singers

 Peter Ortiz as Captain St. Jacques
 Steve Pendleton as Captain Prescott
 Karolyn Grimes as Margaret Mary
 Alberto Morin as Mexican Lieutenant
 Stan Jones as Sergeant
 Fred Kennedy as Trooper Heinze

Production
Background
With the completion of Wagon Master, Ford did not want to make another Western. Instead, he wanted to film the Ireland-set romantic comedy-drama film The Quiet Man with Wayne and Maureen O'Hara, but Herbert Yates, the studio president of Republic Pictures, insisted that Ford first make Rio Grande with the same pairing of Wayne and O'Hara because he thought the script of The Quiet Man was weak and that the story was of little general interest. Yates insisted that Rio Grande be made before The Quiet Man, to offset the anticipated losses on that film. When The Quiet Man was eventually released in 1952, though, it vastly out performed Rio Grande by grossing $3.8 million in its first year and giving Yates and Republic Pictures one of the top-10 hits of the year.

Writing
The script for Rio Grande was written by Irish-born screenwriter James Kevin McGuinness. It is based on a short story "Mission With No Record" by James Warner Bellah that appeared in The Saturday Evening Post on September 27, 1947. Parts of the story loosely resemble the expedition of the 4th Cavalry Regiment (United States) under Colonel Ranald S. Mackenzie when they conducted a military campaign in Mexico in 1873.

McGuinness died in December 1950, just four weeks after the film's premiere in November.

Casting
Former rodeo world champion Ben Johnson had played the leading role in John Ford's Wagon Master, released seven months before Rio Grande. Johnson would later win the Academy Award for Best Supporting Actor for his performance in Peter Bogdanovich's The Last Picture Show in 1971.Rio Grande was the first of three films directed by Ford starring the pairing of John Wayne and Maureen O'Hara, followed by The Quiet Man in 1952 and The Wings of Eagles in 1957. Wayne and O'Hara also starred together in McLintock! (1963) and Big Jake (1971). Rio Grande marked the uncredited debut of 11-year-old Patrick Wayne, Wayne's second son.

Filming
The film was shot entirely on location in Moab, Utah, during the extremely hot summer of 1950. Cast and crew struggled with the heat. Sets and stages had to be built in the difficult conditions, while actors were required to perform their scenes in heavy period costumes.

The location shoot was a prime example of Ford's legendary efficiency—according to Ford scholar Tag Gallagher, Rio Grande was shot in just 32 days, with only 352 takes from 332 camera setups.

Music
The film contains folk songs led by the Sons of the Pioneers, one of whom is Ken Curtis (Ford's son-in-law and best known for his role as Festus Haggen on Gunsmoke). Bob Nolan had previously serenaded Charles Starrett, lead actor in Rio Grande directed by Sam Nelson in 1938.

Reception
A review by New York Times described it as a "familiar story" that "travels a well-rutted road". It was also noted for its similarities to the 1935 epic-adventure film The Lives of a Bengal Lancer''. Praise was given, though, for the Western-style ballads sung by the Sons of the Pioneers.

On Rotten Tomatoes the film has a 71% rating based on reviews from 17 critics.

Accolades
The film was recognized by the American Film Institute in 2008: AFI's 10 Top 10: Nominated Western film.

See also
 John Wayne filmography

References

External links

 
 
 
 

1950 films
1950 Western (genre) films
1950 romantic drama films
American black-and-white films
American Western (genre) films
Films based on short fiction
Films directed by John Ford
Films scored by Victor Young
Films set in 1879
Films set in Texas
Films shot in Utah
Republic Pictures films
Western (genre) cavalry films
1950s English-language films
1950s American films